Mizan Khorasan Volleyball Club is an Iranian professional volleyball team based in Mashhad, Iran. They compete in the Iranian Volleyball Super League.

History
Mizan Khorasan Volleyball Club was founded in 2010 in Mashhad, Iran with the help of Khorasan Razavi Volleyball Association. Mizan first started competing in the Iranian Super League in 2012.

Current squad
3.  Sahab Delghandi
5.  Mohsen Ekhtiarabadi
7.  Mojtaba Yousefi
8.  Mohammad Valipour
9.  Amir Ramshini
10.  Shahrouz Homayounfar
11.  Rahman Davoudi
13.  Soheil Ahmadi
14.  Amin Alavi
15.  Ebrahim Yolmeh
16.  Ali Jafari
17.  Teodor Bogdanov
18.  Mohammad Taher Vadi
19.  Sahand Allahverdian
20.  Alireza Mobasheri
Head coach:  Jabbar Ghouchannejad
Assistant coach:  Bagher Soleimannejad

References

External links
Official club website
Rosters

Iranian volleyball clubs
Sport in Mashhad